Miguel Leite Valente (born 16 July 1993) is a Brazilian swimmer. He competed in the men's 1500-metre freestyle event at the 2016 Summer Olympics. At the 2016 Summer Olympics, he finished 31st in the men's 1500-metre freestyle.

On 14 September 2016, at the José Finkel Trophy (short-course competition), he broke the South American record in the 800-metre freestyle, with a time of 7:42.79. He surpassed Armando Negreiros' time of 7:43.52, conquered in 2009.

At the 2019 Pan American Games held in Lima, Peru, Valente won the silver medal in the Men's 800 metre freestyle, with a time of 7:56.37. He led most of the race, being surpassed only in the end by the American Andrew Abruzzo.

References

External links
 

1993 births
Living people
Brazilian male freestyle swimmers
Olympic swimmers of Brazil
Swimmers at the 2016 Summer Olympics
Swimmers at the 2019 Pan American Games
Place of birth missing (living people)
Pan American Games medalists in swimming
Pan American Games silver medalists for Brazil
Medalists at the 2019 Pan American Games
Sportspeople from Belo Horizonte
21st-century Brazilian people
20th-century Brazilian people